Eemeli Kouki (born ) is a Finnish male volleyball player. He is part of the Finland men's national volleyball team. On club level he plays for Hurrikaani-Loimaa.

References

External links
 profile at FIVB.org

1991 births
Living people
Finnish men's volleyball players
Place of birth missing (living people)